Radhe Mohan Singh  is an Indian Politician and is Member of Parliament of the 15th Lok Sabha of India. He represents the Ghazipur constituency of Uttar Pradesh and is a member of the Samajwadi Party political party.

Early life and education
Radhe Mohan Singh was born in village Karampur, Ghazipur district, in the state of Uttar Pradesh. Singh is a graduate and has a B.A degree from Lalit Narayan Mithila University in Bihar. By profession, Singh is an agriculturist and a transporter.

Political career
Singh is a first time M.P. Prior to 2009, he has served as Chairman, Zila Panchyat of Ghazipur.

Posts held

See also

15th Lok Sabha
Politics of India
Parliament of India
Government of India
Samajwadi Party
Ghazipur (Lok Sabha constituency)

References 

India MPs 2009–2014
1967 births
Samajwadi Party politicians
Lok Sabha members from Uttar Pradesh
Politicians from Ghazipur
People from Ghazipur 
Living people
Uttar Pradesh district councillors